This is a List of United States Air Force aircraft maintenance squadrons.

Squadrons

Special Operations

Expeditionary

References

Maintenance